A housing authority or ministry of housing is generally a governmental body that governs aspects of housing or (called in general "shelter" or "living spaces"), often providing low rent or free apartments to qualified residents. The existence of government agencies specifically concerned with ensuring that housing is available to people living in the country is a comparatively modern development, with the first such agencies being established in U.S. cities in the 1930s, the height of the Great Depression.

Specific housing authorities 

 Hong Kong Housing Authority
 Singapore Housing and Development Board
 Ministry of Housing, Communities and Local Government (UK, since 2006)
 Ministry of Housing and Local Government (UK, historic)
 United States Department of Housing and Urban Development
 United States Housing Authority (United States, historic)
 Boston Housing Authority
 Chicago Housing Authority
 Home Forward, formerly the Housing Authority of Portland
 Housing Authority of the City of Los Angeles
 New York City Housing Authority
 San Francisco Housing Authority
 Housing and Property Development Authority
 Toronto Community Housing Corporation
 Department of Building and Housing (New Zealand), formerly the Ministry of Housing, New Zealand
 Northern Ireland Housing Executive
 Ministry of Local Government Development

See also 

 Public housing